Schizopygopsis is a genus of cyprinid fish. Most species are endemic to river basins in the Himalayas and Qinghai–Tibet Plateau of China, but S. stoliczkai extends into the highlands of Afghanistan, Iran, northern India, Kyrgyzstan, Pakistan and Tajikistan.

S. younghusbandi is up to almost  in total length, but the remaining species generally only reach about two-thirds of that size. Similar to Platypharodon, Schizopygopsis have a horny sheath on the lower jaw and spoon-shaped teeth that they use to scrape off periphyton and algae from stones, but they will also eat benthic invertebrates.

Schizopygopsis is a part of the schizothoracines (snowtrout and allies), which also includes the genera Aspiorhynchus, Chuanchia, Diptychus, Gymnodiptychus, Gymnocypris, Oxygymnocypris, Platypharodon, Ptychobarbus, Schizopyge and Schizothorax.

Species
There are currently eight recognized species in this genus:

 Schizopygopsis anteroventris Wu & Tsao, 1989
 Schizopygopsis kessleri Herzenstein, 1891
 Schizopygopsis kialingensis W. X. Tsao & C. L. Tun, 1962
 Schizopygopsis malacanthus Herzenstein, 1891
 Schizopygopsis pylzovi Kessler, 1876
 Schizopygopsis stoliczkai Steindachner, 1866 (false osman)
 Schizopygopsis thermalis Herzenstein, 1891
 Schizopygopsis younghusbandi Regan, 1905

References 

 
Cyprinidae genera
Cyprinid fish of Asia